The men's 3000 metres steeplechase event at the 2008 World Junior Championships in Athletics was held in Bydgoszcz, Poland, at Zawisza Stadium on 10 and 13 July.

Medalists

Results

Final
13 July

Heats
10 July

Heat 1

Heat 2

Participation
According to an unofficial count, 21 athletes from 16 countries participated in the event.

References

3000 metres steeplechasechase
Steeplechase at the World Athletics U20 Championships